Harold Evelyn Holding (12 April 1883 – 20 July 1925) was a British athlete.  He competed in the 1908 Summer Olympics in London. He was born in Newmarket, Suffolk and died in Coventry.

In the 800 metres, Holding finished third in his initial semifinal heat and did not advance to the final.  His time was 1:58.5.

References

Sources
 
 
 

1883 births
1925 deaths
Athletes (track and field) at the 1908 Summer Olympics
Olympic athletes of Great Britain
English male middle-distance runners
People from Newmarket, Suffolk